Michał Karbownik (born 13 March 2001) is a Polish professional footballer who plays as a defender for 2. Bundesliga side Fortuna Düsseldorf, on loan from Brighton & Hove Albion of the Premier League. He has made three appearances for the Poland national team at senior level.

Club career

Early career
Karbownik was born in the city of Radom, located 62 miles south of Warsaw. He began his football career at Zorza Kowala at the age of 10. In 2012, he joined a local club Młodzik 18 Radom.

Legia Warsaw
In 2015, Karbownik joined Legia Warsaw. He joined the Academy, and was soon promoted to Legia's reserve team in 2016. In 2019, he began training with the first team, and on 25 August 2019, he made his debut for Legia in a 3–2 away win against ŁKS Łódź, providing an assist for Dominik Nagy. He impressed the following game in a 3–1 win against Raków Częstochowa, where he provided an impressive assist for Jarosław Niezgoda. Karbownik quickly established himself as a key player for Legia and became a regular starter. In May 2020, Karbownik extended his contract with Legia until 2024.

Karbownik was a key player in Legia's 2019–20 Ekstraklasa triumph, and soon gained recognition. In January 2020, he was named by UEFA as one of the Best Young Players to look out for in 2020. In February 2020, he was named the 'Discovery of the Year' by Polish football magazine "Piłka Nożna". He won the Ekstraklasa 'Best Youngster of the Season' award for the 2019–20 season, and was in the 40-man shortlist for the Golden Boy award.

Brighton & Hove Albion
On 6 October 2020, he signed for English club Brighton & Hove Albion for a transfer fee of £3 million.

Legia Warsaw (loan)
Karbownik was immediately loaned back to former club Legia Warsaw until the end of the season. Under new head coach Czesław Michniewicz, Karbownik began to play in the midfield (having previously played at left-back under Aleksandar Vuković). On 2 November 2020, Legia confirmed that Karbownik tested positive for COVID-19, which omitted him from Legia's upcoming games. He made a return to the team on 29 November, in a 2–2 draw against Piast Gliwice. However, on 8 December, Legia announced that Karbownik was ruled out of the squad for the rest of 2020 due to stress fractures in his tibia, and was recommended to rest to avoid aggravating the injury.

Return to Brighton
On 17 January 2021, Brighton announced they had recalled Karbownik from his loan at Legia.

Karbownik made his debut for Brighton on 10 February 2021, starting and playing the full match in the 1–0 away defeat against Leicester City in the FA Cup fifth round.

He made his second Brighton appearance and first of the 2021–22 season in Albions 2–0 away victory over Cardiff City in the EFL Cup second round on 24 August 2021.

Olympiacos (loan)
On 28 August 2021, it was announced that Karbownik would join Greek champions Olympiacos on a season-long loan with an option to buy. He made his debut on 12 September, starting in the 0–0 home draw against Atromitos where he was later substituted.

Fortuna Düsseldorf (loan)

Karbownik signed for Fortuna Düsseldorf of the 2. Bundesliga on 4 August 2022, on a season-long loan.

 International career 
In September 2020, Karbownik was called up for Poland's upcoming UEFA Nations League fixtures against the Netherlands and Bosnia and Herzegovina, however he did not make an appearance in any of the two fixtures. On 7 October 2020, a day after completing his transfer to Brighton and Hove Albion, he made a debut for the national team in a 5–1 win against Finland, providing an assist for Arkadiusz Milik. In the following two games, he came on as a substitute for Kamil Jóźwiak in Poland's 0–0 draw against Italy and Poland's 3–0 win against Bosnia and Herzegovina.

Career statistics

HonoursLegia WarsawEkstraklasa: 2019–20, 2020–21OlympiacosSuper League Greece: 2021–22Individual'
Ekstraklasa Young Player of the Month (December): 2019–20
Ekstraklasa Defender of the Season: 2019–20
Ekstraklasa Young Player of the Season: 2019–20

References

Living people
2001 births
People from Radom
Association football midfielders
Polish footballers
Poland youth international footballers
Poland under-21 international footballers
Poland international footballers
Legia Warsaw II players
Legia Warsaw players
Brighton & Hove Albion F.C. players
Olympiacos F.C. players
Fortuna Düsseldorf players
Ekstraklasa players
III liga players
Super League Greece players
Super League Greece 2 players
2. Bundesliga players
Polish expatriate footballers
Expatriate footballers in England
Expatriate footballers in Greece
Expatriate footballers in Germany
Polish expatriate sportspeople in England
Polish expatriate sportspeople in Greece
Polish expatriate sportspeople in Germany